The 2022–23 season is the 113th season in the history of Bologna F.C. 1909 and their eighth consecutive season in the top flight. The club are participating in Serie A and the Coppa Italia.

Players

Other players under contract

Out on loan

Pre-season and friendlies

Competitions

Overall record

Serie A

League table

Results summary

Results by round

Matches 
The league fixtures were announced on 24 June 2022.

Coppa Italia

References

Bologna F.C. 1909 seasons
Bologna